Jean Mantelet (1900–19 January 1991) was a French inventor and industrialist who founded the kitchen appliance company Moulinex.

Professional life
He studied at HEC Paris and in 1922 Jean Mantelet establishes himself as a manufacturer of hand pumps and agricultural sprayers. In 1932, Mantelet invents prize-winning  the Moulin-Légumes, a hand-crank food mill for mashing and puréeing vegetables. The design is considered a forerunner to the modern food processor. In 1978 he was listed among the 25 top most wealthy people in France.

From 1951 to 1973 he was a consultant on French foreign trade. He was a municipal councillor in Alençon from 1959 to 1965. From 1971 to 1974 he was president of the Alençon Chamber of Commerce. In 1991 the route de Mamers in Alençon was renamed avenue Jean Mantelet.

Personal life
Born in east-Paris suburb of Rosny-sous-Bois to a family of artisans. His parents separated in 1903. His mother, working, placed him at the age of 12 in an apprenticeship at a hosiery shop in the rue de Rivoli where he learned the basics of commerce and accounting. He won favour with the proprietor who saw the young man as his future successor. However the proprietor died in 1919 and Jean Mantelet was forced to join his father at his small hardware store. In 1929, he opened a small workshop at Bagnolet where he made hand-powered kitchen equipment, the Manufacture d'Emboutissage de Bagnolet.

References

1900 births
1991 deaths
20th-century French inventors